Liparoceras pseudostriatum is an extinct fossil ammonite species from the Pliensbachian period of the Jurassic. Liparoceras means 'fat head' and this is due to its broad shell. The venter is wide and finely ribbed with no keel and it has two rows of tubercules on each whorl.

Distribution
Jurassic deposits in France the United Kingdom

References

Liparoceratidae
Jurassic ammonites
Fossils of Great Britain
Pliensbachian life